Zac Foot (born 24 December 2000) is a professional Australian rules footballer who last played for the Sydney Swans in the Australian Football League (AFL). He was recruited by the Sydney Swans with the 51st draft pick in the 2018 AFL draft. He debuted in round 12, 2020, against the Greater Western Sydney Giants at Perth Stadium. At the conclusion of the 2020 season Foot was delisted and returned to Melbourne to play with Casey Demons in the VFL.

References

External links

2000 births
Living people
Sydney Swans players
Dandenong Stingrays players
Casey Demons players
Australian rules footballers from Victoria (Australia)